Winkle may refer to:

Snails
 Common periwinkle, an edible marine intertidal species found in Europe and North America
 Any species within the family Littorinidae, the winkles, small intertidal sea snails
 Some edible species of nerites which are also small aquatic snails, some marine, some freshwater
 Sometimes applied to certain land species that have an operculum, such as Pomatias elegans, the land winkle
 Tegula pfeifferi

Places
 Winkle, Illinois, United States, an unincorporated community
 East Danville, Ohio, United States, an unincorporated community also known as Winkle
 Winkle Island (disambiguation), several places with the name

Other uses
 nickname of Eric Brown (pilot) (1919–2016), British Royal Navy officer and test pilot
 Leslie Winkle, a character in the television series The Big Bang Theory
 Nathaniel Winkle, a character in the novel The Pickwick Papers by Charles Dickens
 Winkle squeeze, a play in the card game of contract bridge
 Development codename of the RAF's RX12874 radar detector

See also
 Van Winkle, a surname and a list of people with the surname
 Bobby Winkles (born 1930), American former Major League Baseball coach and manager and college head coach
 Winkel (disambiguation)

Animal common name disambiguation pages